The 2020 Superliga Colombiana (known as the Superliga Águila 2020 for sponsorship purposes) was the ninth edition of the Superliga Colombiana. It was contested by the champions of the 2019 Categoría Primera A season from 8 to 11 September 2020.

The competition, which is usually played in January prior to the start of each Categoría Primera A season, was originally scheduled to be played in the middle of the year due to the schedule saturation caused by the 2020 CONMEBOL Pre-Olympic Tournament and the start of the Primera A tournament in that same month. By February, DIMAYOR was considering to play the Superliga on 31 May 2020 as a single match at a neutral venue outside the country, with Miami as the tentative host city, however, those plans were put on hold due to the COVID-19 pandemic and the suspension of every football tournament. On 31 August 2020, with the announcement of the resumption of the tournaments organized by DIMAYOR, the competition was eventually confirmed to be played on 8 and 11 September 2020, with its usual double-legged series format.

Junior won its second Superliga Colombiana title following a 3–2 win over América de Cali on aggregate.

Teams

Matches

First leg

Second leg

Junior won 3–2 on aggregate.

Notes

References

External links
Superliga on Dimayor's website

Superliga Colombiana
Superliga Colombiana
Superliga Colombiana
Superliga Colombiana